Machalpur is a town and a nagar panchayat in Rajgarh district in the Indian state of Madhya Pradesh.

Geography
It has an average elevation of 389 metres (1,276 feet).

Demographics

As of the 2011 Census of India, Machalpur had a population of 9,476. Males constitute 52% of the population and females 48%. Machalpur has an average literacy rate of 53%, lower than the national average of 59.5%: male literacy is 67%, and female literacy is 39%. In Machalpur, 17% of the population is under 6 years of age. it is near the border of Madhya Pradesh and Rajasthan where a mix of the Rajasthani and Malvi language is spoken.

References

Cities and towns in Rajgarh district
Rajgarh, Madhya Pradesh